This is a list of the Panamanian English number-one songs of 2017. The charts are published by Monitor Latino, based exclusively for English-language songs on airplay across radio stations in Panama using the Radio Tracking Data, LLC in real time. The chart week runs from Monday to Sunday.

Chart history

References 

Panamanian music-related lists
Panama
2017 in Panama